Ganong may refer to:

Ganong Bros., a Canadian chocolates company
Gilbert Ganong (1851–1917), Canadian politician and co-founder of Ganong Bros. Limited
Arthur D. Ganong (1877–1960), Canadian politician
David A. Ganong (born 1943), former president and current chairman of the Board of Ganong Bros. Limited
Travis Ganong (born 1988), American alpine ski racer
William Francis Ganong (1864–1941) Canadian botanist, historian and cartographer
William Francis Ganong, Jr. (1924–2007) American mammalian physiologist